George Alan Martin Cross FRS (born 27 September 1942) is a British molecular parasitologist.  He has been André and Bella Meyer Professor of Molecular Parasitology at Rockefeller University since 1982.  He was elected as a Fellow of the Royal Society in 1984.  He was educated at Cheadle Hulme School and Downing College, Cambridge. He was awarded the Paul Ehrlich and Ludwig Darmstaedter Prize in 1984.

Cross was the first to isolate variant surface glycoproteins.

External links 
 http://www.rockefeller.edu/research/faculty/abstract.php?id=28

Alumni of Downing College, Cambridge
Fellows of the Royal Society
1942 births
Rockefeller University faculty
Living people
People educated at Cheadle Hulme School